The 1921 Navy Midshipmen football team represented the United States Naval Academy during the 1921 college football season. In their second season under head coach Bob Folwell, the Midshipmen compiled a 6–1 record, shut out six opponents, and outscored all opponents by a combined score 

The annual Army–Navy Game was played on November 26 at the Polo Grounds in New York City; Navy

Schedule

References

Navy
Navy Midshipmen football seasons
Navy Midshipmen football